Ranjith Premalal De Silva is a Sri Lankan professor of Agricultural engineering and former Vice Chancellor of the Uva Wellassa University. He is the founder President of Geo-Informatics Society of Sri Lanka. He is the current Vice-Chancellor of University of Vocational Technology. He is the Acting Director and CEO of National Institute of Fundamental Studies, Hantana, Kandy.

Background
De Silva was educated at  Nalanda College, Colombo before he proceeded to the University of Peradeniya where he obtained a bachelor's degree in Agricultural science. He later obtained a master's degree in Agricultural engineering from Asian Institute of Technology,  Thailand before he received a postgraduate certificate in Water resources from the University for Foreigners Perugia.
He received a doctorate degree in Agricultural Engineering from Cranfield University, United Kingdom.

In 2011 De Silva was appointed as the second Vice-Chancellor of Uva Wellassa University, replacing the inaugural Vice-Chancellor Prof. Chandra Embuldeniya. Prior to his appointment at Uva Wellassa University, de Silva was a professor of Geo-informatics in the Department of Agricultural Engineering at the University of Peradeniya.  He was replaced as Vice-Chancellor by Dr G. Chandrasena in September 2014.

References

Further reading 
 
 
 
 
 

Sri Lankan Buddhists
Sri Lankan academic administrators
Alumni of Nalanda College, Colombo
Asian Institute of Technology alumni
Sinhalese engineers
1963 births
Living people